In Greek mythology, Dracius (Ancient Greek: Δρακίος) was a commander of the Epeans of Elis, together with Meges and Amphion, during the Trojan War.

See also 
  for Jovian asteroid 4489 Dracius

Notes

References 

 Homer, The Iliad with an English Translation by A.T. Murray, Ph.D. in two volumes. Cambridge, MA., Harvard University Press; London, William Heinemann, Ltd. 1924. . Online version at the Perseus Digital Library.
 Homer, Homeri Opera in five volumes. Oxford, Oxford University Press. 1920. . Greek text available at the Perseus Digital Library.

Achaeans (Homer)